The Combined Universities cricket team played in First-class cricket matches between 1993 and 1995 and List A cricket matches between 1975 and 1995. This is a list of the players who appeared in those matches.

A

B

C

D

E

F

G

H

I
 Imran Khan (1975): Imran Khan

J

K

L

M

O
 André Odendaal (1980): A Odendaal
 Tim O'Gorman (1988–1989): TJG O'Gorman
 Jonathan Orders (1978–1981): JOD Orders
 Timothy Orrell (1990): TM Orrell

P

R

S

T

U
 Benjamin Usher (1992): BC Usher

V
 Willem van der Merwe (1990): WM van der Merwe
 Jonathan Varey (1982–1983): JG Varey

W

References

Combined Universities